Josiah Sutherland (June 12, 1804 – May 25, 1887) was an American lawyer, jurist, and politician from New York. From 1851 to 1853, he served one term in the U.S. House of Representatives.

Life
He graduated from Union College in 1824. Then he studied law in Waterford, New York, and Hudson, New York, and the Litchfield Law School. He was admitted to the bar in 1828, and commenced practice in Livingston, New York. He was District Attorney of Columbia County from 1832 to 1843. In 1838, he moved to Hudson, New York, the county seat.

Congress 
Sutherland was elected as a Democrat to the 32nd United States Congress, and served from March 4, 1851, to March 3, 1853. Afterwards he resumed the practice of law in New York City.

Jurist 
He was a justice of the New York Supreme Court (1st District) from 1858 to 1871, and was ex officio a judge of the New York Court of Appeals in 1862 and 1870. He was a judge of the New York City Court of General Sessions from 1872 to 1878. Afterwards he resumed the practice of law.

Death and burial 
He died on May 25, 1887 and was buried at the Woodlawn Cemetery, Bronx.

See also

 George G. Barnard

Sources

The New York Civil List compiled by Franklin Benjamin Hough (pages 350 and 372; Weed, Parsons and Co., 1858)
 Court of Appeals judges

External links
 
The Josiah Sutherland Papers at the New-York Historical Society.
The Josiah Sutherland Papers at the Litchfield Historical Society.

1804 births
1887 deaths
Union College (New York) alumni
People from Stanford, New York
People from Livingston, New York
Politicians from New York City
New York Supreme Court Justices
Judges of the New York Court of Appeals
County district attorneys in New York (state)
Burials at Woodlawn Cemetery (Bronx, New York)
Democratic Party members of the United States House of Representatives from New York (state)
People from Hudson, New York
19th-century American politicians
Lawyers from New York City
19th-century American judges
19th-century American lawyers